The IdeaFirst Company (TIFC) is a Philippine film production company and talent agency founded in 2014 by filmmakers Jun Robles Lana and Perci Intalan. The company focuses on film and television production, as well as artist management.

The company is best known for producing Bwakaw (2012), Die Beautiful (2016), Kalel, 15 (2019), and Gameboys (2020).

Background 
The IdeaFirst Company was founded in April 2014 by filmmakers Jun Robles Lana and Perci Intalan. Lana formerly served as the Creative Director for GMA Network, while Intalan was an Executive Producer for Walt Disney and the former first Vice President for Entertainment for TV5. The two filmmakers left their prior positions to co-found the company.

The company has engaged in partnerships with mainstream Philippine film studios such as Viva Films, Star Cinema, Regal Films as well as internationally with Netflix. The company is atypical in that it signs directors as well as actors.

Creatives under IdeaFirst include Sigrid Andrea Bernardo, Christian Bables, and Prime Cruz.

Filmography

Film

Television

Web series

References 

Film production companies of the Philippines
Philippine film studios
Companies established in 2014